Dragan Jović (born 19 July 1963) is a Bosnian professional football manager. He is regarded as one of the most successful Bosnian football managers.

Managerial career

Early career
In his early career, Jović managed Travnik and Posušje. He replaced Blaž Slišković as manager of Zrinjski Mostar in late 2007, and led the team to win the Bosnian Cup in 2008 and the Bosnian Premier League in 2009.

After leaving Zrinjski, Jović became the new manager of Zvijezda Gradačac. Later on, he also managed Sarajevo and Borac Banja Luka.

Primeiro de Agosto
Jović went on to manage Angolan Girabola club Primeiro de Agosto, from 2014 until he left the club for health reasons in December 2017. During his tenure in the club, Jović won two Angolan league titles and one Super Cup.

Return to Primeiro de Agosto
In November 2018, Jović returned as the manager of Primeiro de Agosto. He had success with the club again, winning the 2018–19 Angola Cup after beating Huíla in the final on 25 May 2019. Jović also won the league title in the 2018–19 season and the 2019 Angola Super Cup.

Ismaily
Jović briefly managed Egyptian Premier League club Ismaily from January to March 2021.

Tuzla City
On 13 May 2022, Tuzla City signed Jović to a three-year contract for the start of the 2022–23 season, marking his return to the Bosnian Premier League after eight years. On 7 July 2022, he managed his first match with Tuzla City in a 2–0 away win against Tre Penne in the first qualifying round of the UEFA Europa Conference League. On 21 July, Jović had his first defeat as Tuzla City's manager as AZ Alkmaar was victorious in the second qualifying round of the UEFA Europa Conference League.

On 10 August 2022, he led Tuzla City to a 5–1 away win over Sarajevo, the latter's biggest ever Bosnian Premier League defeat in history.

Jović terminated his contract with Tuzla City by mutual consent in November 2022, following some weeks of him having health problems.

Managerial statistics

Honours

Manager
Zrinjski Mostar 
Bosnian Premier League: 2008–09
Bosnian Cup: 2007–08

Primeiro de Agosto 
Girabola: 2016, 2017, 2018–19
Taça de Angola: 2018–19
Supertaça de Angola: 2017, 2019

References

External links

1963 births
Living people
People from Travnik
Bosnia and Herzegovina football managers
NK Travnik managers
HŠK Posušje managers
HŠK Zrinjski managers
NK Zvijezda Gradačac managers
FK Sarajevo managers
FK Borac Banja Luka managers
C.D. Primeiro de Agosto managers
Ismaily SC managers
FK Tuzla City managers
Premier League of Bosnia and Herzegovina managers
Girabola managers
Egyptian Premier League managers
Bosnia and Herzegovina expatriate football managers
Expatriate football managers in Angola
Expatriate football managers in Egypt
Bosnia and Herzegovina expatriate sportspeople in Angola
Bosnia and Herzegovina expatriate sportspeople in Egypt